Andrzej Mazurkiewicz can refer to the following persons:

Andrzej Mazurkiewicz (politician)
Andrzej Mazurkiewicz (footballer)